Ro-50 was an Imperial Japanese Navy Kaichū type submarine of the K6 sub-class. Completed and commissioned in July 1944, she served in World War II, conducting four war patrols, including operations off the Philippine Islands and the Ryukyu Islands. The only Kaichu-type submarine to survive the war, she surrendered in 1945 after its conclusion and was scuttled in 1946.

Design and description
The submarines of the K6 sub-class were versions of the preceding K5 sub-class with greater range and diving depth. They displaced  surfaced and  submerged.

For surface running, the boats were powered by two  diesel engines, each driving one propeller shaft. When submerged each propeller was driven by a  electric motor. They could reach  on the surface and  underwater.

The boats were armed with four internal bow  torpedo tubes and carried a total of ten torpedoes. They were also armed with a single  L/40 anti-aircraft gun and two single  AA guns.

Construction and commissioning

Ro-50 was laid down at Submarine No. 391 on 18 February 1943 by Mitsui Zosensho at Tamano, Japan. She was launched on 31 July 1943 and was renamed Ro-50 that day. She was completed and commissioned on 31 July 1944.

Service history
Upon commissioning, Ro-50 was attached to the Maizuru Naval District and assigned to Submarine Squadron 11 for workups. She was reassigned to Submarine Division 34 in the 6th Fleet on 5 November 1944.

First war patrol

On 19 November 1944, Ro-50 departed Kure, Japan, to begin her first war patrol, assigned a patrol area in the Philippine Sea east of Luzon in the Philippine Islands.

Believing the plane to have come from a United States Navy aircraft carrier, Ro-50′s commanding officer moved to intercept the carrier. Five hours later, Ro-50 detected propeller noises, and soon thereafter she sighted three aircraft carriers with eight destroyers escorting them in a ring formation. After Ro-50 penetrated the escort screen, she sighted what her commanding officer described as a "Wasp-class" aircraft carrier dead ahead at a range of only  .

Ro-50′s commanding officer claimed to have sunk an escort aircraft carrier and a destroyer in the attack, but postwar analysis disproved his claim, and the explosion and other sounds Ro-50′s crew heard probably were due to premature or end-of-run detonations of her torpedoes. Her target may have been U.S. Navy Task Group 38.3, a component of Task Force 38, because the battleship , operating as a part of that task group, sighted two torpedoes passing ahead of her at the time of Ro-50′s attack, at least one of which appeared to be suffering from a steering problem. Ro-50 returned to Kure on 27 December 1944.

Second war patrol

With 6th Fleet commander-in-chief Vice Admiral Shigeyoshi Miwa on hand to see her off, Ro-50 set out from Kure on 23 January 1945 to begin her second war patrol, again in the Philippine Sea east of Luzon. She was off Leyte on 1 February 1945 when she sighted an Allied ship and pursued it, but she discontinued the chase when she identified it as a hospital ship. On 3 February 1945, she was in the Philippine Sea east of Luzon when an Allied warship — possibly the U.S. destroyer escort , which reported making a depth-charge attack against a sonar contact that day while on the return leg to Manus Island of a round-trip voyage as a convoy escort — pursued and attacked her. She escaped, but suffered damage.

On 4 February 1945, Ro-50 received orders from the 6th Fleet to stand by to evacuate Imperial Japanese Navy pilots stranded in the Batulinao area of northern Luzon. She fired four torpedoes, one of which struck the tank landing ship , which was on a voyage from Hollandia, New Guinea, to Leyte, at about 08:10. The torpedo exploded, blowing off about a third of LST-577, including her bridge. Steaming a few thousand yards to port of LST-577, the destroyer  began a search for Ro-50 while another tank landing ship prepared to take LST-577 under tow and the rest of the convoy and its escorts departed the area.

Isherwood then made sound contact on Ro-50 and dropped a full pattern of depth charges at a shallow setting. The explosion of the depth charges damaged Ro-50, rupturing her diving tank valve, shattering the lenses in both of her periscopes, and causing leaks in all of her torpedo tubes. Isherwood dropped two more full patterns of depth charges before losing contact, and her commanding officer and other members of her crew reported smelling oil.

Ro-50 survived the attacks and escaped. When she surfaced, her crew discovered a  fragment of a depth-charge on her afterdeck, and her commanding officer reported sinking an American cargo ship.

On 14 February 1945, Ro-50 transmitted a situation report to 6th Fleet headquarters and received permission to return to Kure, with orders to conduct a reconnaissance of the Ryukyu Islands en route. An Imperial Japanese Navy floatplane mistakenly attacked her south of Kyushu on 19 February 1945, dropping three depth charges, but she reached Kure on 20 February. She later moved to Maizuru.

Third war patrol

On 20 April 1945, Ro-50 got underway from Maizuru and transited the Bungo Strait to begin her third war patrol, assigned a patrol area in the Philippine Sea off Kitadaitōjima at the northern end of the Daitō Islands southeast of Okinawa. Off Kitadaitōjima on 28 April, she detected the propeller noises of an Allied task force, but was too far away to attempt an attack. She returned to Kure on 4 May 1945, and later moved back to Maizuru.

Fourth war patrol

Ro-50 departed Maizuru on 29 May 1945, heading for an area in the East China Sea east of Formosa for her fourth war patrol. After she arrived in her patrol area on 6 June 1945, she received orders to move to the waters of the Philippine Sea between Okinawa and Ulithi Atoll. Her patrol was uneventful, and she returned to Maizuru on 3 July 1945.

End of war

Ro-50 was still in Japan when Emperor Hirohito announced the end of hostilities between Japan and the Allies on 15 August 1945. She was transferred from Submarine Division 34 to Submarine Division 15 that day. The only Kaichu-type submarine to survive World War II, she surrendered to the Allies in September 1945.

Final disposition
The Japanese struck Ro-50 from the Navy list on 30 November 1945.

Notes

References
 

 

Ro-35-class submarines
Kaichū type submarines
Ships built by Mitsui Engineering and Shipbuilding
1943 ships
World War II submarines of Japan
Shipwrecks in the Pacific Ocean
Shipwrecks of Japan
Maritime incidents in 1946
Scuttled vessels